Dancemania 3 is the third set in the Dancemania series of dance music compilation albums, released in 1996 by EMI Music Japan.

The non-stop mixing was done by Flex Records, a Danish dance label.


Tracks

Further details

The non-stop mixing was handled by Danish dance label Flex Records, mainly, its two main producers; Kenneth Bager and Michael Pfundheller.

The album's overall average tempo is 138 bpm;
#1 The slowest track is "Help Me Dr. Dick" at 103 bpm.
#21 The fastest track is "I Want Your Mind" at 180 bpm.
Several tracks are cover versions or remix versions.
#4 "Let's Groove Rap" is a cover version of Earth, Wind & Fire's "Let's Groove".
#6 "Xanadu" is a cover remix version of Olivia Newton-John's "Xanadu".
#7 "Sunshine" sampled Gipsy Kings' "Bamboleo".
#20 "Where Have All the Flowers Gone" is a cover version of Marlene Dietrich's "Where Have All the Flowers Gone?".
Several tracks on the album can also be found on other Dancemania albums, such as Delux, Zip Mania, Extra, Best Red or Summers.

References

3
1996 compilation albums
Dance music compilation albums
Intercord albums
EMI Records albums